Hydrocynus vittatus, the African tigerfish, tiervis or ngwesh is a predatory freshwater fish distributed throughout much of Africa. This fish is generally a piscivore but it has been observed leaping out of the water and catching barn swallows in flight.

Appearance
The African tigerfish is overall silvery in colour, with thin black stripes running horizontally. It has an elongated body and a red, forked caudal fin with a black edge. Its head is large, as well as its teeth, of which there are eight per jaw. The teeth are sharp and conical which are used to grasp and chop prey. They are able to replace their teeth simultaneously on the upper and lower jaws. Males are larger and more full-bodied than females. It grows to a length of  SL.

Distribution
This species' distribution covers the Niger/Bénoué, Ouémé River, Senegal River, Nile, Omo River, Congo River, Lufira, Lualaba River, Luapula, Zambezi, Limpopo River, Rovuma, Shire River and Wami River; as well as Lakes - Lake Bangweulu, Mweru, Tanganyika, Upemba, Rukwa and Malagarazi. It is also found in the Okavango Basin and lower reaches of coastal systems south to the Pongola River and in man-made Lake Kariba, Lake Jozini and Schroda Dam.

Ecological significance
Tigerfish are an important food and income source for locals. Not only do they provide a natural source of protein, the presence of the fish also promotes tourism through recreational and sport fishing. As a result of their ecological and economic importance, African tigerfish have been extensively studied by conservation groups and university researchers.

Habitat and ecology
African tigerfish mainly live near the bottom of the large freshwater rivers and lakes they inhabit. During the day they tend to be found closer to the surface and then move towards the bottom at night. They thrive in highly oxygenated water in warm climates.

Population and conservation status

This species is common and widespread over most of its range. In the most studied population, that of Lake Kariba on the Middle Zambezi River, the population fluctuated markedly, apparently in direct relation to the abundance of the introduced clupeid Limnothrissa miodon which forms a major part of its diet. There is a commercial fishery in Lake Rukwa, where it forms about 3.9% of the yield.

Hydrocynus vittatus have declined in some river systems in southern Africa as a result of pollution, water abstraction and obstructions by dams and weirs that prevent migration. It is locally threatened by unregulated gillnet fisheries and has been placed on the South African protected species list. In east Africa, threats to populations include overfishing, reductions in water quality due to agricultural activities and deforestation, and pesticide pollution. According to the IUCN Red List of Threatened Species, tigerfish are of least concern with a wide distribution but are protected in some reserves.

Behaviour
Smaller African tigerfish can be found roaming the waters in schools containing similar sized fish. Larger African tigerfish tend to live and hunt alone. The breeding habits of this fish are somewhat elusive but it is thought that breeding may take place over a couple of days during December or January. The timing depends on when the rivers and streams begin to swell due to the start of the rainy season.  Females will lay their eggs in submerged vegetation in shallow water close to the shore.  Hatchling African tigerfish will remain in the safety of the vegetation until the water levels become low enough to force them further into the water. These fish may migrate up to 100 km within the stream or river they inhabit.

Feeding behaviour
These fish are fierce hunters and are mostly piscivorous and tend to eat whatever fish is most available. Smaller fish will hunt in large schools while larger African tigerfish hunt alone. Favoured prey fish include cichlids, gobies, carp, and clariid catfish. Insects and zooplankton may also be part of the African tigerfish's diet, especially during juvenile stages of life.
 
A highly unusual feeding behavior has been confirmed in the Schroda Dam population of Hydrocynus vittatus. The fish jump out of the water and catch barn swallows Hirundo rustica on the wing as they fly near the surface of the lake feeding on insects. This behaviour was speculated previously but this was the first time it had been observed during a specific research project. The researchers observed an average success rate of 25% for predation attempts, with as many as twenty birds caught per day over a relatively small lake (4.1 x 106 m³). African tigerfish were observed to pursue the birds from the surface further below the water. The depth of pursuit will affect the fish's perception of the bird due to light refraction in the water. It is thought that these tigerfish will pursue the bird at a depth that allows the individual to perceive the birds the easiest. This is the only documented instance of a freshwater fish exhibiting this particular behavior. Other freshwater fish have been observed catching birds that are swimming or floating on the water, but not catching them mid-flight.

Pet trade

Due to its ferocious appearance, people may be tempted to keep the African tigerfish as a pet. However, this is generally not recommended and should only be attempted by those with advanced skills in keeping freshwater aquariums. These fish can get extremely large and require at least a  tank. They do not get along well with any fish smaller than them (even of their own species) since smaller fish make up a majority of their diet. As they grow larger, these fish can become very difficult to handle. This is especially true because of their aggressive nature and sharp teeth. Anyone set on having one needs to check the local wildlife laws to determine if import of this fish is legal. It is illegal to import this species into Texas, Utah, and Florida.

References

External links

Alestidae
Freshwater fish of Africa
Taxa named by François-Louis Laporte, comte de Castelnau
Fish described in 1861